The Bangkok International Motor Show is a motor show located in Bangkok, Thailand. It is also known as the "Thailand Motor Show" among automotive enthusiasts. The show takes place annually at the Challenger 1-3, Impact, Muang Thong Thani Center. The Bangkok Motor Show was the first motor show in Thailand, and it remains the largest in the country.

The Bangkok International Motor Show is organized by the Grand Prix International Co. Ltd. It was founded by Dr. Prachin Eamlumnow in 1979. The official co-sponsors of the show are the Royal Automobile Association of Thailand, the Ministry of Industry, the Ministry of Tourism and Sports, the Tourism Authority of Thailand, and the Thai Auto-Parts Manufacturers Association.

Bangkok International Motor Show Accreditation by OICA 
The International Organization of Motor Vehicle Manufacturers was founded in Paris in 1919. It is known as the "Organisation Internationale des Constructeurs d’Automobiles" (OICA). The OICA provides international accreditation to motor shows across the globe, including the Bangkok International Motor Show.

History

First Motor Show in Thailand (2–6 April, 1979) 
The first motor show in Thailand took place from 2 April, 1979, to 6 April, 1979. It received 380 visitors during the first 5 days it was open to the public. The Motor Show became a big annual event on the Thailand Automotive Calendar, and a decade later, Prachin Eamlumnow (founder of the Bangkok Motor Show) was nicknamed the "King of the Motorshow."

Calendar of the Bangkok International Motor Show 
Below is a list of all the Bangkok International Motor Show dates.

References

External link 
 
Auto shows in Thailand
Annual events in Thailand